Persatuan Sepakbola Indonesia Tasikmalaya (commonly known as Persitas Tasikmalaya) is an Indonesian football club based in Tasikmalaya Regency, West Java that competes in Liga 3. Their home base is Wiradadaha Stadium.

Honours
 Liga 3 West Java
 Third-place: 2019

References

External links
 

Football clubs in Indonesia
Football clubs in West Java
Association football clubs established in 1970
1970 establishments in Indonesia